Binidayan, officially the Municipality of Binidayan (Maranao and Iranun: Inged a Binidayan), is a 4th class municipality in the province of Lanao del Sur, Philippines. According to the 2020 census, it has a population of 25,965 people.

List of Elected and Appointed Municipal Mayors
The municipality of Binidayan was created by virtue of Presidential Decree No. 482 series of 1954. Its first local election was held on the 1957 Philippine General Election, hence numerous individuals were appointed as its local officials prior to the 1957 Philippine General Election.

Sultan Raraco Pundag Macaorao was the municipality's first mayor by virtue of appointment. Datu Omar Basman Olama was its first elected municipal mayor, while Sultan Muliloda Dimaporo was the municipality's longest serving chief executive.

After the 1986 People Power Revolution which resulted to the ascension of President Cory Aquino, all incumbent local officials were removed from their respective offices to pave way to President Aquino's reform agenda. As a result, numerous individuals were named as the municipality's officials prior to the 1988 General election.

Appointed Municipal Mayors 

 Sultan Raraco Pundag Macaorao (Upon the creation of the municipality on 1954)
 Macapia Tarawi (Prior to 1957 Philippine presidential election)
 Sultan Abdulmadid "Panondi" Maruhom (Prior to 1957 Philippine presidential election)
 Hadji Usman Lomondag Olama (Prior to 1957 Philippine presidential election)
 Ismael "Mike" Malangas (Provisional Government of the Philippines (1986–1987))
 Zainoden Domaot (Provisional Government of the Philippines (1986–1987))
 Hassim Olama (Provisional Government of the Philippines (1986–1987))
 Maguidala Datumulok Dimaporo (Provisional Government of the Philippines (1986–1987))

Elected Municipal Mayors 

 Omar "Basman" Olama (1957-1961)
 Sultan Muliloda Datumulok Dimaporo (1961-1986;1988-1995)
 Punudaranao Benito Datumulok (1995-2001)
 Aman Misbac Ampuan Datumulok (2001-2010)
 Abdullah Dimaporo Datumulok (2010-2019)
 Sodais Daromoyod Dimaporo (2019-present)

Geography

Barangays
Binidayan is politically subdivided into 26 barangays.

Climate

Demographics

Economy

References

External links
Binidayan Profile at the DTI Cities and Municipalities Competitive Index
[ Philippine Standard Geographic Code]
Philippine Census Information
Local Governance Performance Management System

Municipalities of Lanao del Sur
Populated places on Lake Lanao